Želimir "Željko" Cerović (14 March 1948 – 10 December 2019) was a Montenegrin basketball executive and basketball player. He was the president of the Basketball Federation of FR Yugoslavia.

Basketball career 
Cerović spent the entire playing career with his hometown team Sutjeska.

Cerović was a board member of Budućnost Podgorica from 1984 to 1990. In 1989, he was elected as the presidend of the Basketball Association of Montenegro, a regional association within Basketball Federation of Yugoslavia. He left the federation in 1998.

Cerović served as the president of the Basketball Federation of FR Yugoslavia from 1999 to 2003. During his tenure, the FR Yugoslavia senior national team won gold medals at the 2001 EuroBasket and the 2002 FIBA World Championship.

Cerović was a member of the Presidency of the Basketball Federation of Montenegro until January 2019.

References

1948 births
2019 deaths
Basketball executives
Montenegrin expatriate basketball people in Serbia
Montenegrin men's basketball players
Sportspeople from Nikšić
Yugoslav men's basketball players